Elizeu Zaleski dos Santos (born November 12, 1986) is a Brazilian mixed martial artist. He was the former Jungle Fight welterweight champion in Brazil and currently competes in welterweight division of the Ultimate Fighting Championship (UFC).

Background 
Zaleski was born in Francisco Beltrao, Parana, Brazil. He grew up training Capoeira at age of nine. Zaleski transitioned to MMA at age 20 and started competing professionally soon after.

Mixed martial arts career

Early career 
Zaleski started his MMA career on November 8, 2009, and he fought for many promoters notably Jungle Fight, Smash and Amazon Fight in Brazil. He was the former Jungle Fight welterweight champion and he amassed a record of 14–4 with 13 finishes and 1 decision prior joining UFC.

Ultimate Fighting Championship 
Zaleski made his promotional debut on May 30, 2015, at UFC Fight Night: Condit vs. Alves against Nicolas Dalby. Zaleski outstruck Dalby as he landed 16 more significant strikes, but judges handed the victory via split decision to Dalby as he successfully took Zaleski down six times.

He faced Omari Akhmedov on his next fight at UFC on Fox: Teixeira vs. Evans on April 16, 2016. He won the fight and claimed his first UFC win via knockout in the third round. The fight earned him his first Fight of the Night bonus award.

On October 1, 2016, Zaleski returned to face Keita Nakamura at UFC Fight Night: Lineker vs. Dodson. After three rounds of fighting, he won the fight via unanimous decision with the score board of (29-28, 29-28, 29-28).

Zaleski faced Lyman Good, former Bellator and CFFC champion, on July 22, 2017, at UFC on Fox: Weidman vs. Gastelum. He won the back-and-forth fight by split decision. The fight also earned him his second Fight of the Night bonus award.

Zaleski faced Max Griffin on October 28, 2017, at UFC Fight Night: Brunson vs. Machida. He won the fight via unanimous decision. The win also earned him his third Fight of the Night bonus award.

Zaleski was expected to face Jack Marshman on March 17, 2018, at UFC Fight Night 127. However, on February 19, 2018, it was announced that Zaleski pulled out of the fight, citing a knee injury. He was replaced by Brad Scott

Zaleski faced Sean Strickland on May 12, 2018, at UFC 224. He won the fight via knockout in the first round.

Zaleski was scheduled to meet Belal Muhammad on September 22, 2018, at UFC Fight Night 137. However, on September 14, 2018 Muhammad was pulled from the bout and he was replace by newcomer Luigi Vendramini. He won the fight via knockout in round two.

Zaleski was scheduled to face Li Jingliang on November 25, 2018, at UFC Fight Night 141. However on October 27, 2018, it was reported that Zaleski withdrew from the bout due to a partial ligament tear in his right knee.

Zaleski faced Curtis Millender on March 9, 2019, at UFC Fight Night 146. He won the fight via submission in the first round.

Zaleski was expected to face Neil Magny on May 18, 2019, at UFC Fight Night 151. However, on March 28, 2019 dos Santos announced that he had not been contacted by the UFC about the match.

A pairing with Li Jingliang was rescheduled and took place on August 31, 2019, at UFC Fight Night 157. He lost the fight via technical knockout in round three.

As the last fight of his prevailing contract, Zaleski faced Alexey Kunchenko on March 14, 2020 at UFC Fight Night 170. He won the fight via unanimous decision.

As the first fight of his new, four-fight contract, Zaleski faced Muslim Salikhov on July 11, 2020 at UFC 251. He lost the fight via a split decision.

Zaleski was expected to face promotional newcomer Shavkat Rakhmonov on October 24, 2020 at UFC 254. However, Zaleski pulled out in late September due to a knee injury that required surgery.

Zaleski faced promotional newcomer Benoît Saint-Denis on October 30, 2021 at UFC 267. After nearly finishing Saint Denis in round two, he won the bout via unanimous decision.

Zaleski was scheduled to face Mounir Lazzez on April 16, 2022 at UFC on ESPN 34. However, Zaleski dos Santos withdrew the week of the fight due to personal reasons and was replaced by Ange Loosa.

On September 22, 2022, it was announced that USADA suspended Zaleski for 1 year after testing positive for ostarine in an out-of-competition test on March 14, 2022. Zaleski and his team contended that the test was due to a contaminated supplement. He is eligible to return on March 14, 2023.

Championships and accomplishments

Mixed martial arts 
 Ultimate Fighting Championship
 Fight of the Night (Three times) vs. Omari Akhmedov, Lyman Good and Max Griffin
 Jungle Fight
 Jungle Fight Welterweight Championship (One time)
 One successful title defense

Personal life 
His moniker "Capoeira” was coined as he started his combat sport in Capoeira.

Mixed martial arts record 

|-
|Win
|align=center|23–7
|Benoît Saint-Denis
|Decision (unanimous)
|UFC 267 
|
|align=center|3
|align=center|5:00
|Abu Dhabi, United Arab Emirates
|
|-
|Loss
|align=center|22–7
|Muslim Salikhov
|Decision (split)
|UFC 251 
|
|align=center|3
|align=center|5:00
|Abu Dhabi, United Arab Emirates
|  
|-
|Win
|align=center|22–6
|Alexey Kunchenko
|Decision (unanimous) 
|UFC Fight Night: Lee vs. Oliveira 
|
|align=center|3
|align=center|5:00
|Brasília, Brazil
|
|-
|Loss
|align=center|21–6
|Li Jingliang
|TKO (punches)
|UFC Fight Night: Andrade vs. Zhang
|
|align=center|3
|align=center|4:51
|Shenzhen, China
|
|-
|Win
|align=center|21–5
|Curtis Millender
|Submission (rear-naked choke)
|UFC Fight Night: Lewis vs. dos Santos
|
|align=center|1
|align=center|2:36
|Wichita, Kansas, United States
|
|-
|Win
|align=center|20–5
|Luigi Vendramini
|KO (flying knee and punches)
|UFC Fight Night: Santos vs. Anders
|
|align=center|2
|align=center|1:20
|São Paulo, Brazil
|
|-
|Win
|align=center|19–5
|Sean Strickland
|KO (spinning wheel kick and punches)
|UFC 224
|
|align=center|1
|align=center|3:40
|Rio de Janeiro, Brazil
|
|-
|Win
|align=center|18–5
|Max Griffin
|Decision (unanimous)
|UFC Fight Night: Brunson vs. Machida
|
|align=center|3
|align=center|5:00
|São Paulo, Brazil
|
|-
|Win
|align=center| 17–5
|Lyman Good
|Decision (split)
|UFC on Fox: Weidman vs. Gastelum
|
|align=center|3
|align=center|5:00
|Uniondale, New York, United States
|
|-
| Win
| align=center| 16–5
| Keita Nakamura
| Decision (unanimous)
| UFC Fight Night: Lineker vs. Dodson
| 
| align=center| 3
| align=center| 5:00
| Portland, Oregon, United States
|
|-
| Win
| align=center| 15–5
| Omari Akhmedov
| TKO (knees and punches)
| UFC on Fox: Teixeira vs. Evans
| 
| align=center| 3
| align=center| 3:03
| Tampa, Florida, United States
| 
|-
| Loss
| align=center| 14–5
| Nicolas Dalby
| Decision (split)
| UFC Fight Night: Condit vs. Alves
| 
| align=center| 3
| align=center| 5:00
| Goiânia, Brazil
|
|-
| Win
| align=center| 14–4
| Eduardo Ramon
| Submission (rear-naked choke)
| Jungle Fight 75
| 
| align=center| 2
| align=center| 2:07
| Belém, Brazil
|
|-
| Win
| align=center| 13–4
| Itamar Rosa
| KO (punches)
| Jungle Fight 71
| 
| align=center| 1
| align=center| 1:59
| São Paulo, Brazil
|
|-
| Win
| align=center| 12–4
| Rodrigo Souza
| KO (punches)
| Jungle Fight 65
| 
| align=center| 2
| align=center| 2:57
| Bahia, Brazil
|
|-
| Win
| align=center| 11–4
| Josenildo Ramalho
| KO (punches)
| Jungle Fight 59
| 
| align=center| 1
| align=center| 2:42
| Rio de Janeiro, Brazil
|
|-
| Loss
| align=center| 10–4
| Guilherme Vasconcelos
| Submission (rear-naked choke)
| Jungle Fight 54
| 
| align=center| 2
| align=center| 2:20
| Rio de Janeiro, Brazil
|
|-
| Win
| align=center| 10–3
| Ricardo Silva
| KO (punches)
| Smash Fight
| 
| align=center| 1
| align=center| 1:16
| Curitiba, Brazil
|
|-
| Win
| align=center| 9–3
| Gilmar Dutra Lima
| KO (punch)
| Smash Fight
| 
| align=center| 1
| align=center| 0:27
| Curitiba, Brazil
|
|-
| Loss
| align=center| 8–3
| Franklin Jensen
| Decision (unanimous)
| Sparta MMA
| 
| align=center| 3
| align=center| 5:00
| Itajai, Brazil
|
|-
| Win
| align=center| 8–2
| Misael Chamorro
| Submission (rear-naked choke)
| Beltrão Combat
| 
| align=center| 2
| align=center| 1:35
| Francisco Beltrão, Brazil
|
|-
| Loss
| align=center| 7–2
| Viscardi Andrade
| Submission (rear-naked choke)
| Max Fight 11
| 
| align=center| 2
| align=center| 1:27
| São Paulo, Brazil
|
|-
| Loss
| align=center| 7–1
| José de Ribamar
| Decision (split)
| Amazon Fight 10
| 
| align=center| 3
| align=center| 5:00
| Belém, Brazil
|
|-
| Win
| align=center| 7–0
| Jackson Pontes
| TKO (punches)
| Max Fight 10
| 
| align=center| 1
| align=center| 2:42
| São Paulo, Brazil
|
|-
| Win
| align=center| 6–0
| João Paulo Prado
| TKO (retirement)
| Vale Fighting Championship
| 
| align=center| 2
| align=center| 5:00
| São Paulo, Brazil
|
|-
| Win
| align=center| 5–0
| Misael Chamorro
| TKO (punches)
| Big Bold's Night
| 
| align=center| 1
| align=center| N/A
| Cascavel, Brazil
|
|-
| Win
| align=center| 4–0
| Dyego Roberto
| TKO (body kick)
| Samurai Fight Combat 3
| 
| align=center| 3
| align=center| 4:16
| Curitiba, Brazil
|
|-
| Win
| align=center| 3–0
| Christian Tide Squeti
| Decision (split)
| Londrina Fight Show 1
| 
| align=center| 3
| align=center| 5:00
| Londrina, Brazil
|
|-
| Win
| align=center| 2–0
| Wellington Morgenstern
| KO (punches)
| B33 Fight 8
| 
| align=center| 1
| align=center| 0:00
| Ponta Grossa, Brazil
|
|-
| Win
| align=center| 1–0
| Douglas Jandozo
| KO (punches)
| G1: Open Fight 7
| 
| align=center| 1
| align=center| 3:03
| Joaquim Tavora, Brazil
|
|-

See also 
 List of current UFC fighters
 List of male mixed martial artists

References

External links 
 
 

1986 births
Living people
Brazilian male mixed martial artists
Welterweight mixed martial artists
Mixed martial artists utilizing capoeira
Mixed martial artists utilizing Muay Thai
Mixed martial artists utilizing Brazilian jiu-jitsu
Sportspeople from Paraná (state)
Brazilian people of Polish descent
Brazilian capoeira practitioners
Brazilian Muay Thai practitioners
Brazilian practitioners of Brazilian jiu-jitsu
People awarded a black belt in Brazilian jiu-jitsu
Ultimate Fighting Championship male fighters